La Tania is a ski resort in the Courchevel area of Les Trois Vallees at 1400m above sea level.  It was developed for the Albertville Olympics of 1992 and is approximately a 25 minutes drive from Moûtiers.

Overview

The ski resort is near numerous hotels and other residential buildings, as well as a small town.

The village is served by a 12 person gondola which links to two high speed chairs (Dou des Launches (4 man) & Bouc Blanc (6 man)) from where touristscan ski down to either the Courchevel or Meribel ski areas. There is a series of 2 drag lifts that connects the Courchevel side of the mountain to the nearby village. La Tania also is associated with the ski-school École du ski Français, the largest ski-school in France, and other ski-schools; Supreme Ski and Snowboard School, Magic In Motion, New Generation, Ultimate Snowsports, Cab9, Momentum Ski and Ski Class. 

There are three pistes that wind down through the forest into the village from the top of the gondola - red, blue and green; with the blue and green benefiting from snow cannons for all season access. La Tania also has a free beginners drag lift which runs throughout the season (Troika).

With its northeast facing slopes, the powder here can often remain overlooked for several days, especially the Gazex couloirs off the Col de la Loze, named Gazex 1,2 and 3, by La Tania legends Nic Atkinson, Mark Jones & Billy Manson. Pub Le Ski Lodge is the main social centre of La Tania run by Tim Wall since the building of the resort. The local community website updated by Toffa keeps everyone informed of what is going on.

References

External links
 Vanoise National Park
 

Ski areas and resorts in France
Tourist attractions in Savoie
Sports venues in Savoie